{{DISPLAYTITLE:C13H14O3}}
The molecular formula C13H14O3 (molar mass: 218.248 g/mol, exact mass: 218.0943 u) may refer to:

 NCS-382
 Toxol

Molecular formulas